Swapnil Bandiwar (born 9 August 1988) is an Indian first-class cricketer who plays for Vidarbha. He made his List A debut on 27 February 2014, for Vidarbha in the 2013–14 Vijay Hazare Trophy.

References

External links
 

1988 births
Living people
Indian cricketers
Vidarbha cricketers
People from Amravati